Munbura is a rural locality in the Mackay Region, Queensland, Australia. In the  Munbura had a population of 115 people.

History 
The locality takes its name from the Munbura railway station which was named on 30 October 1913 by the Queensland Railways Department. It is an Aboriginal word  meaning poplar gum.

Munbura State School opened on 16 August 1920 and closed in December 1971.

In the  Munbura had a population of 115 people.

Geography
Alligator Creek forms the eastern boundary, and Bells Creek the northern and western. Sarina Homebush Road (State Route 5) follows the south-western boundary.

References 

Mackay Region
Localities in Queensland